The Ateshgah of Baku (from , Ātashgāh), often called the "Fire Temple of Baku", is a castle-like religious temple in Surakhany town (in Surakhany raion), a suburb in Baku, Azerbaijan.

Based on Persian and Indian inscriptions, the temple was used as a Hindu, Sikh, and Zoroastrian place of worship. "Ātash" (آتش) is the Persian word for fire. The pentagonal complex, which has a courtyard surrounded by cells for monks and a tetrapillar-altar in the middle, was built during the 17th and 18th centuries. It was abandoned in the late 19th century, probably due to the dwindling of the Indian population in the area. The natural eternal flame went out in 1969, after nearly a century of exploitation of petroleum and gas in the area, but is now lit by gas piped from the nearby city.

The Baku Ateshgah was a pilgrimage and philosophical centre of Zoroastrians from Northwestern Indian subcontinent, who were involved in trade with the Caspian area via the famous "Grand Trunk Road". The four holy elements of their belief were: ateshi (fire), badi (air), abi (water), and heki (earth). The temple ceased to be a place of worship after 1883 with the installation of petroleum plants (industry) at Surakhany. The complex was turned into a museum in 1975. The annual number of visitors to the museum is 15,000.

The Temple of Fire "Ateshgah" was nominated for List of World Heritage Sites,  UNESCO in 1998 by Gulnara Mehmandarova. On December 19, 2007, it was declared a state historical-architectural reserve by decree of the President of Azerbaijan.

Etymology
The Persian toponym Atashgah (with Russian/Azerbaijani pronunciation: Atashgyakh/Ateshgah) literally means "home of fire." The Persian-origin term atesh (آتش) means "fire", and is a loanword in Azerbaijani; it is etymologically related to the Vedic अथर्वन् atharvan. Gah (گاہ) derives from Middle Persian and means "throne" or "bed" and it is cognate with Sanskrit gṛha गृह for "house", which in popular usage becomes gah. The name refers to the fact that the site is situated atop a now-exhausted natural gas field, which once caused natural fires to spontaneously burn there as the gas emerged from seven natural surface vents. Today, the fires in the complex are fed by gas piped in from Baku, and are only turned on for the benefit of visitors.

Surakhani, the name of the town where the Ateshgah is located, likely means "a region of holes" (سراخ/suraakh is Persian for "hole"), but might perhaps be a reference to the fire glow as well (سرخ/sorkh/surkh is Persian for "red"). A historic alternative name for Azerbaijan as a whole has been Odlar Yurdu, Azeri for "land of fires". The etymology in Sanskrit for Surakhany is "mine of the gods" from sura which stands for the "gods", who stand in opposition to the asuras, the demons.

Surakhany in Tati (the language of Surakhany, close to Persian) means “hole with the fountain”.

History

Surakhany is located on the Absheron peninsula, which is famous for being a locality where oil oozes naturally from the ground and flames burn perpetually — as at Yanar Dag — fed by natural hydrocarbon vapours issuing from the rock.

Sarah Ashurbeyli notes that the Atsh is distorted Atesh (“fire”) and Atshi-Baguan means “Fires of Baguan”, referring to Baku. The word Baguan comes from the word Baga, which means “God” in Old Persian, and Bhaga, भग, also means "God" in Sanskrit.

"Seven holes with eternal fires" were mentioned by German traveler Engelbert Kaempfer, who visited Surakhany in 1683.

Estakhri (10th century) mentioned that not far from Baku (i.e., on the Apsheron Peninsula) lived fire worshippers. This was confirmed by Movses Daskhurantsi in his reference of the province of Bhagavan (“Fields of the Gods” i.e., “Fire Gods”).

In the 18th century, Atashgah was visited by Zoroastrians. The Persian handwriting Naskh inscription over the entrance aperture of one of the cells, which speaks about the visit of Zoroastrians from Isfahan:

Persian inscription:

Transliteration of Persian inscription:

ātaši saf kešide hamčon dak
jey bovāni reside tā bādak
sāl-e nav-e nozl mobārak bād goft
xāne šod ru *sombole sane-ye hazār-o-sad-o-panjāh-o-haštom

Translation:

Fires stand in line
Esfahani Bovani came to Badak [Baku]

"Blessed the lavish New Year", he said:The house was built in the month of Ear in year 1158.The 1158 year corresponds to 1745 AD. Bovan (modern Bovanat) is the village near Esfahan. The word Badak is a diminutive of Bad-Kubeh. (The name of Baku in the sources of the 17th and 18th centuries was Bad-e Kube). At the end of the reference is the constellation of Sombole /Virgo (August–September). In the name of the month the master mistakenly shifted the “l” and “h” at the end of the word. According to Zoroastrian calendar Qadimi New Year in 1745 AD was in August.

Interesting information about Zoroastrianism in Baku is given by D. Shapiro in A Karaite from Wolhynia meets a Zoroastrian from Baku. Avraham Firkowicz, a Karaite collector of ancient manuscripts, wrote about his meeting in Darband in 1840 with a fire-worshipper from Baku. Firkowicz asked him “Why do you worship fire?” The fire-worshipper replied that he worshipped not fire, but the Creator symbolised by fire - a “matter” or abstraction (and hence not a person) called Q’rţ’ . Pahlavi Q’rţ’  (from Avestan kirdar or Sanskrit kṛt and कर्ता) signifies  “one who does” or “creator”.

Structure

Some scholars have speculated that the Ateshgah may have been an ancient Zoroastrian shrine that was decimated by invading Islamic armies during the Muslim conquest of Persia and its neighboring regions. It has also been asserted that, "according to historical sources, before the construction of the Indian Temple of Fire (Atashgah) in Surakhany at the end of the 17th century, the local people also worshipped at this site because of the 'seven holes with burning flame'."

Fire is considered sacred in Hinduism and Zoroastrianism (as Agni and Atar, respectively), and there has been debate on whether the Atashgah was originally a Hindu structure, or a Zoroastrian one. The trident mounted atop the structure is usually a distinctly Hindu sacred symbol (as the Trishula, which is commonly mounted on temples) and has been cited by Zoroastrian scholars as a specific reason for considering the Atashgah as a Hindu site. However, an Azerbaijani presentation on the history of Baku, which calls the shrine a "Hindu temple", identifies the trident as a Zoroastrian symbol of "good thoughts, good words and good deeds". even though the trident symbol is not associated with Zoroastrianism

One early European commentator, Jonas Hanway, bucketed Zoroastrians, Sikhs, and Hindus together with respect to their religious beliefs: "These opinions, with a few alterations, are still maintained by some of the posterity of the ancient Indians and Persians, who are called Gebers or Gaurs, and are very zealous in preserving the religion of their ancestors; particularly in regard to their veneration for the element of fire." Geber is a Persian term for Zoroastrians, while Gaurs are a priestly Hindu caste. A later scholar, A. V. Williams Jackson, drew a distinction between the two groups. While stating that "the typical features which Hanway mentions are distinctly Indian, not Zoroastrian" based on the worshipers' attires and tilakas, their strictly vegetarian diets and open veneration for cows, he left open the possibility that a few "actual Gabrs (i.e. Zoroastrians, or Parsis)" may also have been present at the shrine alongside larger Hindu and Sikh groups.

Indian local residents and pilgrims

In the late Middle Ages, there were significant Indian communities throughout Central Asia. In Baku, Indian merchants from the Multan region of Punjab controlled much of the commercial economy (see also Multani Caravanserai). Much of the woodwork for ships on the Caspian was also done by Indian craftsmen. Some commentators have theorized that Baku's Indian community may have been responsible for the construction or renovation of the Ateshgah.

As European academics and explorers began arriving in Central Asia and the Indian subcontinent, they documented encounters with dozens of Hindus at the shrine as well as Sikh pilgrims en route in the regions between North India and Baku.

Samuel Gottlieb Gmelin's Reise durch Russland (1771) is cited in Karl Eduard von Eichwald's Reise in den Caucasus (Stuttgart, 1834) where the naturalist Gmelin is said to have observed Yogi austerities being performed by devotees. Geologist Eichwald restricts himself to a mention of the worship of Rama, Krishna, Hanuman and Agni. In the 1784 account of George Forster of the Bengal Civil Service, the square structure was about 30 yards across, surrounded by a low wall and containing many apartments. Each of these had a small jet of sulphurous fire issuing from a funnel "constructed in the shape of a Hindu altar." The fire was used for worship, cooking and warmth, and would be regularly extinguished.

"The Ateshgyakh Temple looks not unlike a regular town caravansary - a kind of inn with a large central court, where caravans stopped for the night. As distinct from caravansaries, however, the temple has the altar in its center with tiny cells for the temple's attendants - Indian ascetics who devoted themselves to the cult of fire - and for pilgrims lining the walls."

Zoroastrian local residents and pilgrims

There are some data that in addition to the Hindus in the temple were present Zoroastrians (Parsis and Guebres) and Sikhs.
Chardin in the 17th century reported about Persian Guebres, which worshiped forever burning fire that was in two days' journey from Shemakha (on the Apsheron).

Engelbert Kaempfer, who visited Surakhany in 1683, wrote that among people who worshiped fire, two men are descendants of Persians who migrated to India.

French Jesuit Villotte, who lived in Azerbaijan since 1689, reports that Ateshgah revered by Hindus, Sikhs, and Zoroastrians, the descendants of the ancient Persians.

German traveler Lerch who visited the temple in 1733, wrote that here there are 12 Guebres or ancient Persian fire worshipers».

J. Hanway visited Baku in 1747 and left few records of Ateshgah. People, who worshiped fire in Ateshgah he calls "Indians", "Persians" and “Guebres”.

S. Gmelin, who visited Ateshgah in 1770, wrote that in the present Ateshgah lived Indians and descendants of the ancient Guebres.

In 1820 the French consul Gamba visits the temple. According to Gamba here lived Hindus, Sikhs, and Zoroastrians, the followers of Zoroaster.

The Englishman Ussher visited Ateshgah in September 19, 1863 He calls it "Atash Jah" and said that there are pilgrims from India and Persia 
German Baron Max Thielmann visited the temple in October 1872 and in his memoirs he wrote that Parsi community of Bombay sent here a priest who after a few years will be replaced. His presence is necessary, because here come the pilgrims from the outskirts of Persia (Yazd, Kerman) and from India and remain in this sacred place for several months or years.

In 1876 English traveler James Bruce visited Ateshgah. He noted that the Bombay Parsi Punchayat provides a permanent presence in the temple of their priest. Pierre Ponafidine visited the temple at the same time and mentioned about two priests from Bombay.
E. Orsolle, who visited the temple after Bruce, said that after Parsi priest died in 1864, the Parsi Punchayat of Bombay a few years later sent another priest here, but the pilgrims who came here from India and Iran have already forgotten the sanctuary, and in 1880 there was nobody.
O'Donovan visited the temple in 1879 and refers about religious worship of Guebres.

In 1898 in the «Men and Women of India» magazine was published an article entitled "The ancient Zoroastrian temple in Baku. Author calls Ateshgah as "Parsi temple," and notes that the last Zoroastrian priest was sent there for about 30 years ago (that is, in the 1860s.).
J. Henry in 1905, in his book also noted that 25 years ago (i.e. about in 1880) in Surakhani died last Parsi priest.

The Parsi Dastur J.J. Modi who visited the site in 1925 was emphatic that it was not a Zoroastrian temple because of its design and other considerations. He believed it was a Hindu temple.

Inscriptions and likely period of construction

There are several inscriptions on the Ateshgah. They are all in either Sanskrit or Punjabi, with the exception of one Persian inscription that occurs below an accompanying Sanskrit invocation to Lord Ganesha and Jwala Ji. Although the Persian inscription contains grammatical errors, both the inscriptions contain the same year date of 1745 Common Era (Samvat/संवत 1802/१८०२ and Hijri 1158/١١٥٨). Taken as a set, the dates on the inscriptions range from Samvat 1725 to Samvat 1873, which corresponds to the period from 1668 CE to 1816 CE. This, coupled with the assessment that the structure looks relatively new, has led some scholars to postulate the 17th century as its likely period of construction. One press report asserts that local records exist that state that the structure was built by the Baku Hindu traders community around the time of the fall of the Shirvanshah dynasty and annexation by the Russian Empire following the Russo-Persian War (1722–1723).

The inscriptions in the temple in Sanskrit (in Nagari Devanagari script) and Punjabi (in Gurmukhi script) identify the site as a place of Hindu and Sikh worship, and state it was built and consecrated for Jwala Ji, the modern Hindu fire deity. Jwala (जवाला/ज्वाला) means flame in Sanskrit (c.f. Indo-European cognates: proto-Indo-European guelh, English: glow, Lithuanian: zvilti) and Ji is an honorific used in the Indian subcontinent. There is a famed shrine to Jwala Ji in the Himalayas, in the settlement of Jawalamukhi, in the Kangra district of Himachal Pradesh, India to which the Atashgah bears strong resemblance and on which some scholars (such as A. V. Williams Jackson) suggested the current structure may have been modeled. However, other scholars have stated that some Jwala Ji devotees used to refer to the Kangra shrine as the 'smaller Jwala Ji' and the Baku shrine as the 'greater Jwala Ji'. Other deities mentioned in the inscriptions include Ganesha and Shiva. The Punjabi language inscriptions are quotations from the Adi Granth, while some of the Sanskrit ones are drawn from the Sat Sri Ganesaya namah text.

Examination by Zoroastrian priests

In 1876, James Bryce visited the region and found that "the most remarkable mineral product is naphtha, which bursts forth in many places, but most profusely near Baku, on the coast of the Caspian, in strong springs, some of which are said to always be burning." Without referencing the Atashgah by name, he mentioned of the Zoroastrians that "after they were extirpated from Persia by the Mohammedans, who hate them bitterly, some few occasionally slunk here on pilgrimage" and that "under the more tolerant sway of the Czar, a solitary priest of fire is maintained by the Parsee community of Bombay, who inhabits a small temple built over one of the springs".

The temple was examined in the late 19th and early 20th century by Parsi dasturs, some of whom had also visited the Jwala Ji at Kangra in the Himalayas. Based on the inscriptions and the structure, their assessment was that the temple was a Hindu and Sikh shrine. In 1925, a Zoroastrian priest and academic Jivanji Jamshedji Modi traveled to Baku to determine if the temple had indeed been once a Zoroastrian place of worship. Until then (and again today), the site was visited by Zoroastrian pilgrims from India. In his Travels Outside Bombay, Modi observed that "not just me but any Parsee who is a little familiar with our Hindu or Sikh brethren's religion, their temples and their customs, after examining this building with its inscriptions, architecture, etc., would conclude that this is not a [Zoroastrian] Atash Kadeh but is a Hindu Temple whose Brahmins (priests) used to worship fire (Sanskrit: Agni)."

Besides the physical evidence indicating that the complex was a Hindu place of worship, the existing structural features are not consistent with those for any other Zoroastrian or Sikh places of worship (for instance, cells for ascetics, fireplace open to all sides, ossuary pit and no water source. It cannot be ruled out that the site may once have been a Zoroastrian place of worship. As a Hindu temple it is taken to belong to one of four major fire Jwala Ji temples.

J. Unvala visited temple in 1935 and noted that its structure is pure Sasanian style.

Exhaustion of the natural gas

The fire was once fed by a vent from a subterranean natural gas field located directly beneath the complex, but heavy exploitation of the natural gas reserves in the area during Soviet rule resulted in the flame going out in 1969. Today, the museum's fire is fed by mains gas piped in from Baku city..

Claimed visit by Tsar Alexander III

There were local claims made to a visiting Zoroastrian dastur in 1925 that the Russian Tsar Alexander III who was in Baku in 1888 witnessed Hindu fire prayer rituals at this location. However, the latter claim had not been verified.

Public recognition

An illustration of the Baku Fire Temple was included on two denominations of Azerbaijan's first issue of postage stamps, released in 1919. Five oil derricks appear in the background.

By a presidential order issued in December 2007, the shrine complex, which had hitherto been officially associated with the "Shirvanshah Palace Complex State Historical and Architectural Museum-Reserve" (Государственного историко-архитектурного музея-заповедника «Комплекс Дворца Ширваншахов») was declared as a distinct reserve by the Azerbaijani government (the "Ateshgah Temple State Historical Architectural Reserve, Государственным историко-архитектурным заповедником «Храм Атешгях»'').

In July 2009, the Azerbaijani President, Ilham Aliyev, announced a grant of AZN 1 million for the upkeep of the shrine.

In April 2018, the former External Affairs Minister of India, Sushma Swaraj, visited and paid her respects to the shrine.

Gallery

See also
 Qobustan, Baku
 Yanar Dag
 Zoroastrianism in Azerbaijan
 Hinduism in Azerbaijan
 List of World Heritage Sites in Azerbaijan

References

Further reading

External links and photographs
 Indian Inscriptions on the Fire Temple at Bāku (1908)
 “Atəşgah məbədi” - official web-site of museum fire temple Atashgah (in Azeri)
 Sanskrit invocation to Lord Shiva in an Atashgah inscription, with the Hindu devotional-form of the Swastika on top
 Punjabi inscription on the Atashgah beginning with Ik Onkar Satnam"
 The cremation pit on the Atashgah premises

18th-century Hindu temples
Museums established in 1975
Monuments and memorials in Azerbaijan
Museums in Baku
Former religious buildings and structures in Azerbaijan
Zoroastrianism in Azerbaijan
Fire temples in Azerbaijan
Hindu temples in Azerbaijan
Hinduism in Azerbaijan
Gurdwaras
Persistent natural fires
History museums in Azerbaijan
Chahartaqis